Pal Chhin (translation: Moment) is an Indian television drama series which ran on Star Plus from 1999. It was directed by Neena Gupta, and veteran actor Manohar Singh played the protagonist of the show.

The title song of the show 'Koi atka hua hai pal shayad' was written by Gulzar and sung by Jagjit Singh

Synopsis

Pal Chhin is about the conflicts between good and evil. The mounting pressures of modern life coupled with never-ending desire make traditional values look farcical. The mantras for success today are aggression and manipulation. The serial is about the conflict of the old and new as well.

The protagonist, Manohar Singh, believes in traditional themes such as honesty, affection and sincerity. He believes that if you are honest to yourself and good to others, there is no way you can't succeed. But he has to face pitfalls every day for being so out of sync with the present system. He has his detractors in his house, like his eldest son Ranjit who believes in the 'instant culture'. For him, the end is more important than the means, and definitely more important than his father's idealism.

Manohar Singh wants to make a statement that all is not lost and there is some hope left, that we can lead our lives with dignity and belief in our values, still be successful in the accepted sense. These are the moments in our lives, which lead our destinies.

Cast
 Manohar Singh as Manohar Singh
 Gurpreet Singh as Ranjeet Singh
 Arun Govil as Pratap Singh
 Prabha Sinha as Sandhya Pratap Singh
 Aparna Bhatnagar as Pinky Singh
 Shilpa Tulaskar as Charulata
 Savita Prabhune as Damyanti Singh
 Anant Jog as Rajendra
 Cezanne Khan as Rajesh
 Jaya Bhattacharya as Anjali
 Sanjay Swaraj as Shekhar
 Mohan Bhandari

References

External links
 http://www.starindiacontent.com/shows.asp?programid=116
 Pal Chhin title song on YouTube

StarPlus original programming
1999 Indian television series debuts
Indian drama television series